Articles (arranged alphabetically) related to Burkina Faso include:

0-9
 1998 African Cup of Nations
 2022 Burkinabé coup d'état

A
 African bush elephant
 African civet
 African clawless otter
 African Democratic Rally (Burkina)
 African Independence Party
 African Independence Party (Burkina Faso)
 African Independence Party (Touré)
 African Popular Movement
 African Regroupment Party (Upper Volta)
 African wild dog
 AfricaPhonebook (Annulaires Afrique)
 Agacher Strip War
 Air Burkina
 Alliance for Democracy and Federation
 Alliance for Democracy and Federation-African Democratic Rally
 Alliance for Progress and Freedom
 Ambassadors from Canada to Burkina Faso
 Ambassadors to Burkina Faso
 Andanggaman
 Archdiocese of Bobo-Dioulasso
 Archdiocese of Koupéla
 Archdiocese of Ouagadougou
 Arli National Park / (Parc national d'Arli)

B
 .bf
 Bado, Laurent
 Bambara language
 Banfora
 Bank of Africa
 Banque Sahélo-Saharienne pour l'Investissement et le Commerce
 Barraud, Ali
 Barro, Oumar
 Barro, Tanguy
 Bassolé-Ouédraogo, Angèle
 Bassolet, François
 Batié, Burkina Faso
 Berber music
 Bissa language
 Bissa people
 Bissa, Balé
 Bissa, Bam
 Black Volta
 Bobo-Dioulasso
 Bobo Dioulasso Airport
 Bogandé
 Boni, Nazi
 Bonkoungou, Juliette
 Boromo
 Boucle du Mouhoun Region
 Boulsa
 Boussé
 BRVM
 Burkina Airlines
 Burkina Faso
 Burkina Faso at the 1988 Summer Olympics
 Burkina Faso at the 1992 Summer Olympics
 Burkina Faso at the 1996 Summer Olympics
 Burkina Faso at the 2000 Summer Olympics
 Burkina Faso at the 2004 Summer Olympics
 Burkina Faso at the 2008 Summer Olympics
 Burkina Faso at the 2012 Summer Olympics
 Burkina Faso at the 2016 Summer Olympics
 Burkina Faso at the 2020 Summer Olympics
 Burkina Faso at the Olympics
 Burkina Faso national football team
 Burkinabé Bolshevik Party
 Burkinabé Communist Group
 Burkinabé cuisine
 Burkinabé Football Federation
 2002 Burkinabé parliamentary election
 2007 Burkinabé parliamentary election
 Burkinabé Party for Recasting
 Burkinabé Party for Refoundation
 2005 Burkinabé presidential election
 Burkinabé Socialist Bloc
 Burkinabé Socialist Party

C
 Cape hare
 Cascades Region
 Celestair
 Central Bank of West African States
 Centre Region
 Centre-Est Region
 Centre-Nord Region
 Centre-Ouest Region
 Centre-Sud Region
 Change 2005
 Cheetah
 Cinema of Burkina Faso
 Cisse, Abdoulaye
 Cisse, Brahima
 Coalition of Democratic Forces
 Coat of arms of Burkina Faso
 Collective of Democratic Mass Organizations and Political Parties
 Colonial heads of Burkina Faso (Upper Volta)
 Comazar
 Common chimpanzee
 Common genet
 Communications in Burkina Faso
 Compaoré, Blaise
 Compaoré, Chantal
 Compaore, Daouda
 Congress for Democracy and Progress
 Conombo, Henoc
 Conombo, Joseph
 Convention of Democratic Forces
 Convention of Progress Forces
 Convergence for Social Democracy (Burkina Faso)
 Convergence of Hope
 Coulibaly, Amadou
 Augustin Sondé Coulibaly
 Coulibaly, Daniel Ouezzin
 Culture of Burkina Faso
 Current of Democrats Faithful to the Ideal of Thomas Sankara

D
 Dagano, Moumouni
 Dakio, Toubé Clément
 Dano, Burkina Faso
 Dao, Bernadette Sanou
 Dédougou
 Democratic Forces for Progress
 Democratic and Popular Rally
 Demographics of Burkina Faso
 Departments of Burkina Faso
 Diallo, Arba
 Diallo, Mohamed Ali
 Dialogue of the Burkinabè Opposition
 Dianda, Salif
 Diapaga
 Diébougou
 Dioula language
 Diplomatic missions of Burkina Faso
 Districts of Burkina Faso
 Djerma
 Djibo
 Djimini
 Dogon languages
 Dorcas gazelle
 Dori, Burkina Faso
 Dossama, Madou

E
 Ecobank
 Ecologist Party for the Development of Burkina
 Economy of Burkina Faso
 Education in Burkina Faso
 Elections in Burkina Faso
 Est Region
 Etruscan Resources

F
 Fada N'gourma
 Faso Airways
 February 14th Group
 Fennec
 FESPACO award winners
 Flag of Burkina Faso
 Flag of Upper Volta
 Foreign relations of Burkina Faso
 Four-toed hedgehog
 French West Africa
 Fula language
 Fula people

G
 Gaoua
 Garango
 Gay rights in Burkina Faso
 Gayéri
 Geography of Burkina Faso
 Giant pangolin
 Gnonka, Jean-Michel Liade
 Golden jackal
 Gorom-Gorom
 Gourcy
 Grivet
 Group of Patriotic Democrats
 Guinea baboon
 Guirma, Frédéric
 Gurma
 Gurunsi

H
 Hamadryas baboon
 Hausa genet
 Hauts-Bassins Region
 Heads of government of Burkina Faso
 Heads of state of Burkina Faso
 History of Burkina Faso
 Houndé

I
 Ilboudo, Monique
 International School of Ouagadougou
 Islam in Burkina Faso

J

K
 Kaboré, Gaston
 Kaboré, Mohamed
 Kaboré, Nayabtigungu Congo
 Kaboré, Philippe Zinda
 Kaboré, Roch Marc Christian
 Kafando, Michel
 Kambou, Bèbè
 Karaboro languages
 Kaya, Burkina Faso
 Kéré, Mahamoudou
 Ki-Zerbo, Joseph
 Kokologo
 Kombissiri
 Komoé River
 Koné, René Lompolo
 Koné, Yssouf
 Kongoussi
 Korbeogo, Brahima
 Kordié
 Koudougou
 Kouka, Bam
 Kouka, Banwa
 Koulibaly, Pierre
 Koulouba
 Koupéla
 Kourouma, Moustapha

L
 Lake Bam
 Lamizana, Sangoulé
 Lankoandé, Ali
 Léo, Burkina Faso
 Lingani, Jean-Baptiste Boukary
 Lion
 Liptako-Gourma Authority
 List of airports in Burkina Faso
 List of birds of Burkina Faso
 List of Burkinabé films
 List of Burkinabès
 List of cities in Burkina Faso
 List of national parks of Burkina Faso
 List of people on stamps of Burkina Faso
 List of political parties in Burkina Faso
 Loropeni

M
 Mandinka people
 Manga, Burkina Faso
 Mare aux Hippopotames
 Marxist-Leninist Group
 Media in Burkina Faso
 Internet
 Bendré, news and commentary 
 Burkina Online, portal 
 Print
 L'Indépendant, weekly, founded in 1993.
 Le Pays, daily, founded in 1991.
 Le Journal du Jeudi, satirical weekly.
 Observateur Paalga, daily with a weekly supplement, founded in 1973, burnt down in 1984, reestablished in 1991.
 San Finna, weekly appearing Mondays, since 1999. 
 Sidwaya, daily. 
 L'Hebdomadaire du Burkina, weekly.
 L'Evénement, monthly.
 L'Opinion, weekly. 
 Radio
 Radio Nationale du Burkina
 Radio Arc-en-Ciel
 Radio Évangile Développement
 Radio Lumière
 Radio Maria
 Horizon FM
 Radio Salankoloto
 Radio Énergie
 Radio Pulsar, 01 BP 5976, Ouagadougou 01 Tel: 30.75.45
 Radio France Internationale (RFI)
 Television
 La Télévision du Burkina 
 Méguet
 Military of Burkina Faso
 Minoungou, Dieudonné
 Moctar, Tall
 Mogho Naba
 Mogtedo
 More language
 Mossi people
 Mossi Kingdoms
 Movement for Socialist Democracy
 Movement for Tolerance and Progress
 Music of Burkina Faso
 Moro-Naba
 Moro-Naba Ceremony

N
 Nacro, Fanta Régina
 Naganagani
 Nanerige language
 Natama, Toussaint
 National Assembly of Burkina Faso
 National Confederation of Workers of Burkina
 National Convention of Progressive Democrats
 National Culture Week of Burkina Faso
 National Museum of Music
 National Organisations of Free Trade Unions
 National Patriots' Party
 National Rebirth Party
 National Union for Democracy and Development
 National Union for the Defense of Democracy
 Nature reserves of Burkina Faso
 New Social Democracy
 Nikiema, Abdoul-Aziz
 Nord Region
 Nouna

O
 Olive baboon
 Orodara
 Organization for Popular Democracy – Labour Movement
 Oti River
 Ouagadougou
 Ouagadougou Airport
 Ouahigouya
 Ouargaye
 Ouarkoye
 Ouattara, Amara Ahmed
 Ouattara, Boureima
 Ouattara, Moussa
 Ouedraogo, Ablassé
 Ouédraogo, Ali
 Ouédraogo, Bernard Lédéa
 Ouédraogo, Clément Oumarou
 Ouédraogo, Gerard Kango
 Ouédraogo, Gilbert Noël
 Ouédraogo, Halidou
 Ouedraogo, Idrissa
 Ouédraogo, Jean-Baptiste
 Ouédraogo, Joseph
 Ouedraogo, Kadré Désiré
 Ouédraogo, Macaire
 Philippe Ouédraogo (cardinal)
 Philippe Ouédraogo (politician)
 Ouédraogo, Pierre
 Ouédraogo, Rabaki Jérémie
 Ouédraogo, Rahim
 Ouédraogo, Ram
 Ouédraogo, Sidiyété
 Ouédraogo, Youssouf

P
 Pale fox
 Pama
 Panafrican Film and Television Festival of Ouagadougou
 Panandétiguini, Madi Saidou
 Paré, Pargui Emile
 Party for Democracy and Progress (Burkina Faso)
 Party for Democracy and Progress / Socialist Party
 Party for Democracy and Socialism
 Party of Independents
 Party of Labour of Burkina
 Patas monkey
 Patriotic Front for Change
 Patriotic League for Development
 Pissila
 Pitroipa, Jonathan
 Plateau-Central Region
 Pô
 Politics of Burkina Faso
 Polytechnic University of Bobo-Dioulasso (UPB)
 Popular Action Grouping
 Popular Front (Burkina Faso)
 Pouytenga
 Prime Minister of Burkina Faso
 Provinces of Burkina Faso
 Public holidays in Burkina Faso

Q

R
 Rally of the Ecologists of Burkina
 Ratel
 Red-fronted gazelle
 Red Volta
 Regions of Burkina Faso
 Réo
 Republican Party for Liberty
 Rollo, Burkina Faso
 Roman Catholicism in Burkina Faso
 Rulers of the Gurma Mossi state of Bongandini
 Rulers of the Gurma Mossi state of Nungu
 Rulers of the Mossi state of Gurunsi
 Rulers of the Mossi state of Gwiriko
 Rulers of the Mossi state of Yatenga
 Rusty-spotted genet

S
 Sahara Desert
 Sahel Region
 Sankara, Bénéwendé Stanislas
 Sankara, Thomas
 Sankarist Democratic Front
 Sankarist Pan-African Convention
 Sanou, Firmin
 Sanou, Idrissa
 Sanou, Olivier
 Sanou, Ousmane
 Sanou, Wilfried
 Sapouy
 Sawadogo, Marie Blandine
 Sawadogo, Moussa
 Sawadogo, Salimata
 Sebba
 Senegal bushbaby
 Senufo language
 Senufo people
 SIAO
 Side-striped jackal
 Sindou
 Sitarail
 Slender mongoose
 Social Forces Front
 Social Party for the Emancipation of the African Masses
 Socialist Alliance (Burkina Faso)
 Societe Semafo
 Solenzo
 Somda, Jean Emile
 Some, Malidoma Patrice
 Somé, Sobonfu
 Somé, Valère
 Soulama, Abdoulaye
 Speckle-throated otter
 Spotted hyena
 Stade du 4 Août
 Stade Balibiè
 Stade Banfora
 Stade de Kadiogo
 Stade Municipal (Bobo Dioulasso)
 Stade Municipal (Ouagadougou)
 Stade de la SONABEL
 Stade de l'USFA
 Stade Wobi Ouagadougou
 Striped hyena
 Striped polecat
 Sub-Saharan Africa
 Sucite language
 Sud-Ouest Region

T
 Tall, Amadou Tidiane
 Tall, Mamadou
 Tangin Dassouri
 Tassembedo, Soumaila
 Tena Kourou
 Tenkodogo
 Tiendpalogo
 Tilaï
 Titao
 Toma, Burkina Faso
 Tougan
 Tour du Faso
 Touré, Amadou
 Tourism in Burkina Faso
 Trade unions in Burkina Faso
 Trade Union Confederation of Burkina
 Transport in Burkina Faso
 Traore, Alain
 Traoré, Lamine
 Traoré, Ousmane
 Traoré, Seydou
 Tree pangolin

U
 Une Seule Nuit
 Unified Democratic Party
 Unified Socialist Party (Burkina Faso)
 Union of Burkinabé Communists
 Union of Communist Struggles
 Union of Communist Struggles – The Flame
 Union of Communist Struggles – Reconstructed
 Union of Democrats and Independent Progressives
 Union for Rebirth / Sankarist Party
 University of Koudougou
 University of Ouagadougou
 Upper Volta
 Upper Volta at the 1972 Summer Olympics
 1978 Upper Voltan presidential election
 1957 Upper Voltan Territorial Assembly election

V
 Volta River
 Voltaic Communist Organization
 Voltaic Democratic Movement
 Voltaic Labour Party
 Voltaic Regroupment Movement
 Voltaic Revolutionary Communist Party
 Voltaic Solidarity
 Voltaic Union

W
 W National Park
 Water supply and sanitation in Burkina Faso
 West Africa
 White-tailed mongoose
 White Volta
 Wildlife of Burkina Faso

X

Y
 Yaaba
 Yako
 Yaméogo, Hermann
 Yaméogo, Maurice
 Yameogo, Narcisse
 Yameogo, Salvador
 Yao, Oubkiri Marc
 Yarga, Larba
 Yonli, Paramanga Ernest
 Yoryan, Gabriel Somé

Z
 Zango, Hugues Fabrice
 Zebango, Marlène
 Zerbo, Saye
 Zinado
 Ziniaré
 Zio, Franck
 Zongo, Henri
 Zongo, Issa
 Zongo, Mamadou
 Zongo, Norbert
 Zongo, Ousmane
 Zongo, Tertius
 Zorgo
 Zoubga, Alain
 Zoundi, Patrick

See also
 Lists of country-related topics – similar lists for other countries
 List of Burkinabès

Burkina Faso